Tammaru (also Romanized as Tammarū and Tamrū) is a village in Kheyrgu Rural District, Alamarvdasht District, Lamerd County, Fars Province, Iran. At the 2006 census, its population was 108, in 24 families.

References 

Populated places in Lamerd County